Horacio Sanz (born June 4, 1969), better known by his stage name Horatio Sanz, is a Chilean-American actor and comedian. Sanz is best known for his tenure as a cast member on the NBC sketch comedy series Saturday Night Live from 1998 to 2006.

Early life
Sanz was born on June 4, 1969, in Santiago to Sylvia and Carlos Sanz. He is the youngest of three sons and the younger brother of actor Carlos Sanz. He grew up in the Humboldt Park neighborhood of Chicago.

Career
Sanz performed at various theaters in Chicago, including The Court Theater and The Second City, where he was a member of their Chicago ETC theater. While in Chicago, Sanz was also one of the founding members of the Upright Citizens Brigade (UCB) sketch comedy and improv troupe. Sanz can still be seen regularly performing with the sketch troupe at their long-running improv show "ASSSSCAT 3000", at both of the UCB's comedy theaters, located in New York City and Los Angeles.

Saturday Night Live
Sanz joined the cast of Saturday Night Live in September 1998 as the first Hispanic cast member. At the beginning of SNLs 31st season, he was the temporary replacement for Tina Fey as Amy Poehler's Weekend Update co-anchor while Fey was on maternity leave until she resumed her duties on October 22, 2005. On September 20, 2006, SNL announced that Sanz would not be returning due to budget cuts.

Sanz returned to SNL as a guest on February 3, 2007, appearing as Elton John, and on November 3, as presidential candidate Bill Richardson and again on the December 17, 2011, Christmas show as himself in a musical number ("I Wish It Was Christmas Today") and as a member of Beethoven's orchestra ("Beethoven: Meet The Band").

Characters on SNL
 Aaron Neville as a courtroom judge on City Court, who sang and overused cocoa butter
 Gobi, the cannabis-loving co-host of Jarret's Room
 Jasper Hahn, a cartoonist whose creations always start out as raunchy drawings of genitals
 Rick, stepfather of Kaitlin (played by Amy Poehler)
 Jeffrey's Clothing Store customer
 Carol, a cheerful and crass woman
 Ferey Mühtar, host of "The Ferey Mühtar Talk Show"
 Manuel Pantalones, bandleader on "Showbiz Grande Explosion"
 Frankie Hilbert, from the Boston Teens
 Vasquez-Gomez-Vasquez
 One of the Telemundo actors from "Besos Y Lagrimas"
 Gerardo (musician)
 Sammo Hung
 Matt LeBlanc as his character Joey Tribbiani from the TV show Friends
 Elton John
 Billy Joel
 Rosie O'Donnell
 Gene Shalit
 Umberto Unity

After SNL
Sanz was part of the cast of the short-lived ABC sitcom In the Motherhood in 2009, playing the role of Horatio the "manny" (male nanny). In 2010, Sanz and his former SNL castmate Chris Parnell starred together on Big Lake, a Comedy Central sitcom from executive producers Will Ferrell and Adam McKay. From 2010 to 2011, Sanz was a writer and producer on the Comedy Central sketch series Nick Swardson's Pretend Time.

In 2015, he started his own podcast called The Hooray Show, which features comedy sketches and interviews with his friends in comedy.

Sanz appeared as a guest on The Big Alakens, the Big Lake marathon fundraiser episode of The George Lucas Talk Show.

Personal life
In November 2008, Sanz made his first public appearance in almost a year, after having lost . "I've been eating better", Sanz said. "I've been trying to come up with a joke about how I've lost weight and I was going to say, 'I stopped putting nuts in my sundaes.'" He also says, "I never weighed myself when I was at my fattest, because I was scared I might die'." Sanz says he has been working out, too. In June 2009, he appeared on Late Night with Jimmy Fallon and said that much of his weight loss was because he had stopped drinking alcoholic beverages.

He became an American citizen on July 25, 2018, in Los Angeles, California.

Sexual assault allegation
On August 12, 2021, a lawsuit was filed against Sanz, accusing him of sexual assault. The woman, remaining anonymous, claimed that Sanz would grope her and make sexual comments towards her, while she was under the age of 18. The lawsuit also states that both Saturday Night Live and NBC allowed him to participate in the acts and accuses Sanz of a direct digital assault that supposedly happened in front of other staff members in May 2002. Sanz responded through his attorney by calling the allegations "categorically false."

NBCUniversal filed a motion to dismiss the lawsuit in April 2022, stating "Employers owe no general duty to protect third-persons from the possibility of sexual abuse by their employees". In August 2022, the accuser requested that Jimmy Fallon, Tracy Morgan, and Lorne Michaels be added to the lawsuit as defendants, alleging they enabled Sanz's behavior. On November 23, 2022, Horatio Sanz settled with the accuser and the lawsuit was dismissed.

Filmography

Film

Television

Awards and honors
Sanz received "high" honors at High Times magazine's 2003 Stony Awards, collecting the "Stoner of the Year" award.

See also
Recurring Saturday Night Live characters and sketches

References

External links

Upright Citizens Brigade Theater Profile
Review of Christmas sketch show at UCB
Interview with Horatio Sanz

1969 births
Living people
20th-century American comedians
20th-century American male actors
21st-century American comedians
21st-century American male actors
American impressionists (entertainers)
American male comedians
American male film actors
American male television actors
American male voice actors
American podcasters
American sketch comedians
Chilean emigrants to the United States
Comedians from Illinois
Hispanic and Latino American male actors
Male actors from Chicago
People from Santiago
People with acquired American citizenship
Upright Citizens Brigade Theater performers